Livestock is a 2009 American independent horror film directed by Christopher Di Nunzio. From a screenplay by Di Nunzio. Starring Fiore Leo, Robert Hines, Johanna Gorton, Michael Reardon, and features Christina C. Crawford, Irina Peligrad, Matt Phillion, Aurora Grabill, Slava Dorogapulko, Leighsa Burgin, Lou Fuoco, Stephanie Spry, Vinnie Di Nunzio. Livestock was made on a low budget and filming began in Boston, Massachusetts in 2007.

In August 2009 R-Squared Films acquired distribution rights of Livestock and released the DVD on November 10, 2009.

Plot
A mysterious cult has decided to take a new direction in giving Victor, a hard working trusted member, a promotion. However, his cruel minded disciples have decided to take action of their own. Growing tired of their monotonous plans, they begin to take their malevolent acts one step further. In a world seemingly far removed from Victor's, two young girls, Annabel and Tina, are trying to make changes in their own lives. Annabel prepares for a second date with Jerry, a man she met online, while Tina keeps focused on an important meeting that is sure to open up new doors in her life. Soon these two worlds collide as Annabel and Tina find themselves deep within the belly of the beast, and the long, dark history of a secret organization is revealed.

Cast
Fiore Leo as Victor Corsi
Robert Hines as Edgar Ozera
Johanna Gorton as Annabel
Michael Reardon as Anthony
Christina C. Crawford as Tina York
Irina Peligrad as Natalia
Matt Phillion as Jerry
Aurora Grabill as Bella
Slava Dorogapulko as Dimitri
Leighsa Burgin as Angel
Lou Fuoco as Ted Costa
Stephanie Spry as Kristen
Vincent Di Nunzio as Mario
R. Harvey Bravman as Stef

The Pack
Roy Bosell
Derek J. Santos
Beverly Thompson
Carina Di Nunzio
Scott Reardon

Other Cast
Jodie Peck As Waitress
Charlie Peck as Waiter

Crew
Christopher DiNunzio - Director, Producer, Writer
R. Harvey Bravman - Executive Producer
Jason Miller - Co-producer
Nolan Yee - Director of Photography
Nicholas David Potvin - Music
Michael Kovalko - Sound
Tim Skoog - Sound
Hannah Sanders - FX Makeup
Ralph DiNunzio - Artwork
Donna Reardon - Set Design

Production
Filming locations

Boston, Massachusetts - East Boston - Allston - Brookline - Revere
Livestock was shot in 16 days.

Awards
Robert Hines and Irina Peligrad were Nominated for best Actor and Actress at The 2009 San Antonio Horrific Film Festival. It was for their work in "Livestock" (2009). The festival was August 27-30th 2009, San Antonio, Texas, U.S.A.

External links

2009 films
2009 horror films
2000s English-language films